The Public Services of Sri Lanka are a series of services groups that provide specialized professional services to the Government of Sri Lanka. These are government employees who carry out public duties, however they are not elected officials. The most senior of these is the Sri Lanka Administrative Service which is the country's permanent bureaucracy. The Sri Lankan Government is the largest employer in the country and the public services are often criticized as overstaffed and inefficient.

Their members are selected by competitive examination and promotions are made by the Public Service Commission.

Public Services
(Professionals)
Sri Lanka Administrative Service
Sri Lanka Overseas Service
Sri Lanka Police Service
Sri Lanka Customs Service
Sri Lanka Educational Administrative Service
Sri Lanka Immigration Service
Sri Lanka Inland Revenue Service
Sri Lanka Accountants' Service
Sri Lanka Medical Service
Sri Lanka Planning Service
Sri Lanka Information & Communication Technology Service
Sri Lanka Agricultural Service
Sri Lanka Valuers' Service
Sri Lanka Scientific Service
Sri Lanka Engineering Service
Sri Lanka Animal Protection and Health Service
Sri Lanka Surveyors' Service
Sri Lanka Architects Service
Sri Lanka Technical Education Service
Sri Lanka Technical Service
Sri Lanka Translators' Service
Judicial Service
Legal Officers
Island Wildlife Service
Nursing Service 
Principle Service
Teaching Service
Sri Lanka Development Officers’ Service

Support Services
(Non professionals)
Management Service Officer Service
Development officer Service			
Librarians Service 			
Drivers Service 			
Office Employees Service (K.K.S.) 			
Management Assistance Service 			
Sri Lanka Development Assistants' Service

References

 
Civil Service of Sri Lanka
Public administration